Jason Rodney Lyons (born 15 June 1970 in Mildura, Victoria) is an Australian international motorcycle speedway rider. Jason is the son of former rider Rod Lyons. The younger Lyons was the winner of the Australian Pairs Championship in 1992 as well as Victorian State Champion in 1997, 1998 and 1999 and he won the South Australian Championship in 1999.

Jason Lyons has finished runner up five times in the Australian Championship, his best finish in his national championship. He also finished third in the 1991 Australian Under-21 Championship. In his junior speedway career, Lyons finished second behind good friend and fellow Mildura native Leigh Adams in the 1986 Australian Under-16 Championship. Coincidentally, his first three senior Australian Championship second places were also to Adams.

Career history
Lyons started his UK career with the Glasgow Tigers in the National League alongside fellow Aussie Shane Bowes from Adelaide. He joined the Belle Vue Aces in 1992 where he stayed for twelve consecutive seasons and where he gained the nickname 'Mr. Belle Vue'. Lyons was a member of the Australian team that won the World Team Cup in 1999 and the team that won the World Cup in 2002. The 2002 Final was run on the East of England Showground, the home track of his then Premier League club the Peterborough Panthers.

In his only appearance in the World Under-21 Championship final in 1991 at the Brandon stadium in Coventry, England, Lyons finished a fine third behind Danes Brian Andersen (winner) and Morten Andersen (second).

In 1993, Lyons won the Jack Young Memorial Cup at the North Arm Speedway in Adelaide, South Australia. In 1996 he won the Peter Craven Memorial at Belle Vue in Manchester. Both trophies are held in honour of former Speedway World Champions, with Lyons being the first Australian to win both Memorials.

In 2003 Lyons qualified for his only full season in the Speedway Grand Prix series, although he had ridden twice previously, finishing fourth in the Grand Prix of Great Britain in 2000.

In 2007 he signed for the newly reformed Birmingham Brummies as captain and stayed with the Brummies until the end of 2010. Jason signed for the Redcar Bears alongside 1992 World Champion Gary Havelock.

World Final Appearances

World Pairs Championship
 1993 -  Vojens, Speedway Center (with Leigh Adams / Craig Boyce) - 6th - 13pts (5)

World Team Cup
 1999 -  Pardubice, Svítkova Stadion (with Jason Crump / Leigh Adams / Ryan Sullivan / Todd Wiltshire) - Winner - 40pts (10)

World Cup
 2002 -  Peterborough, East of England Showground (with Todd Wiltshire / Leigh Adams / Jason Crump / Ryan Sullivan) - Winner - 64pts (3)
 2003 -  Vojens, Speedway Center (with Jason Crump / Todd Wiltshire / Ryan Sullivan / Leigh Adams) - 2nd - 57pts (0)

Individual Under-21 World Championship
 1991 -  Coventry, Brandon Stadium - 3rd - 11pts

Speedway Grand Prix results

References

1970 births
Living people
People from Mildura
Australian speedway riders
Speedway World Cup champions
Polonia Bydgoszcz riders
Birmingham Brummies riders
Belle Vue Aces riders
Newcastle Diamonds riders
Mildenhall Fen Tigers riders
Peterborough Panthers riders
Poole Pirates riders
Glasgow Tigers riders
Australian expatriate sportspeople in Poland
Expatriate speedway riders in Poland